Nila Heredia Miranda (born in Uyuni, Potosí) is a former medical school anatomy professor and administrator, former leftist militant, and Bolivia's Minister of Health and Sports, a position she has occupied twice.

In the 1970s, Heredia was a member of the Revolutionary Workers' Party of Bolivia and the National Liberation Army during the dictatorship of Hugo Banzer. She was detained by government forces on 2 April 1976, and according to a petition filed with the Inter-American Court of Human Rights, tortured in the prefectural headquarters in Cochabamba and held in Viacha prison.

References

Living people
People from Antonio Quijarro Province
1943 births
21st-century Bolivian women politicians
21st-century Bolivian politicians
Health ministers of Bolivia
Women government ministers of Bolivia